Avery Publishing is a book publishing imprint of the Penguin Group, founded as an independent publisher in 1976 by Rudy Shur and partners, and purchased by Penguin in 1999. The current president is veteran publisher William Shinker. Their offices were located at one time in Garden City, New York, home to other publisher's offices.

Penguin merged the Gotham Books and Hudson Street Press imprints into Avery in 2015.

Partial bibliography
Foods That Heal: A Guide to Understanding and Using the Healing Powers of Natural Foods, Bernard Jensen (1989) 
Confessions of a Kamikaze Cowboy: A True Story of Discovery, Acting, Health, Illness, Recovery, and Life, Dirk Benedict (1991) 
Dressed to Kill: The Link between Breast Cancer and Bras, Sydney Ross Singer and Soma Grismaijer (1995) , 9780895296641
When Enough is Enough: A Comprehensive Guide to Successful Intervention, Candy Finnigan (2008) 
Sharks Don't Get Cancer, I. William Lane (1992)
NeuroTribes, Steve Silberman (Samuel Johnson Prize, 2015)

Notes and references 

1976 establishments in New York (state)
Book publishing companies based in New York City
Garden City, New York
Penguin Random House